A46 may refer to:

Roads:
 A46 road, a long distance A road between Bath and Cleethorpes, in England
 Bundesautobahn 46, a motorway in North Rhine-Westphalia, Germany
 A46 autoroute, a motorway in France

Other:
 Aero A.46, a Czechoslovakian military prototype biplane